The R890 road is a regional road in Co. Wexford, Ireland and runs between Blackstoops Roundabout and Cathedral Street, both in Enniscorthy. It serves as an inner relief road to relieve traffic on the R772 (previously N11) and R744 (previously N30) roads through Enniscorthy town. It is roughly 1.5km long.

References 

Regional roads in the Republic of Ireland
Roads in County Wexford